Murroogh, sometimes named Murrooghtoohy or Murroghtwohy, is a hamlet in County Clare, Ireland. It covers the townlands of Murrooghtoohy North and Murrooghtoohy South. It is within the civil parish of Gleninagh, in the Barony of Burren.  The area was officially classified as part of the West Clare Gaeltacht; an Irish-speaking community; until 1956.

See also
 List of towns and villages in Ireland

References

Towns and villages in County Clare